International Music Summit (IMS) is a 3-day electronic dance music (EDM) conference that takes place in Ibiza. It is described by founder Pete Tong as "an intense networking environment with the glamour and glitz of my favorite party island of Ibiza, but with a Back to Business ethos and leading into the official Ibiza opening party weekend". The conference is seen as a direct competitor to Miami's Winter Music Conference.

History 
The first International Music Summit took place in 2008 and was open to 300 delegates.  In 2009 the number of delegate badges available was increased to 400, and saw the addition exhibition space for 30 companies.

DJs and producers who attended the 2008 summit included Leftfield's Neil Barnes, Layo & Bushwacka!, François K, Beyond the Wizard's Sleeve's Richard Norris, Robbie Rivera, Lemon Jelly's Fred Deakin, Rob da Bank and Tom Middleton.

The 2009 event is set to be attended by managers/agents of artists, DJs and producers including Simian Mobile Disco, Underworld, Mark Ronson, Little Boots, Charlie May, Paul Oakenfold, Röyksopp, Moby, Carl Cox and Mylo, as well as representatives of events/clubs such as Creamfields, Bestival and Pacha.  There will also be a keynote speech by Canadian electronic musician Richie Hawtin.

The 2011 event included a Speed Pitching event with George Ergatoudis, the BBC Radio One head of music and the grand finale was closing party on the Baluarte De Santa Lucia in the UNESCO World Heritage Site of Dalt Vila in Eivissa town featuring sets from Pete Tong, Dubfire, Jason Bentley and 2manydjs.

Conferences in 2020 and 2021 were unable to take place due to the Coronavirus pandemic. 2022 will be the first time the event is hosted at Pacha's Destino Ibiza resort hotel.

In February 2023, it was announced the US-owned online music store, Beatport had acquired a majority stake in the International Music Summit.

Anthems
2008 Tom Middleton - "Remember the Love"
Remix by Wayne from Soul Avengerz
2009 Dirty Vegas - "Tonight"
Remix by Jono Grant from Above & Beyond

Industry reports
The 2014 business report by the International Music Summit, estimated the EDM industry market worth $6.2 billion a year.

See also

List of electronic music festivals
Live electronic music
Music industry
Dance music

References

External links
 International Music Summit (IMS Ibiza) the event's official site
 Music Week "Tong fronts first International Music Summit"
 Internet DJ Interview with Pete Tong
 The Independent "Dance music is beating digital Darwinism law"

Music festivals established in 2008
Music conferences
Culture of Ibiza
Electronic music festivals in Spain
May events